is the sixth album from the J-pop idol group Morning Musume. The album was released on December 8, 2004.

Overview

Ai no Dai 6 Kan contains three hit singles, all released prior to the album between April and December 2004: "Roman: My Dear Boy", "Joshi Kashimashi Monogatari", and "Namida ga Tomaranai Hōkago". Ai Kago and Nozomi Tsuji (who graduated from the group in August 2004 to continue with their duo W (Double You) full-time) perform along with the other 12 members of the group at the time on the first two aforementioned tracks, recorded and released as singles when they were a part of the group, and on "Ship To The Future", a song from Morning Musume's Spring 2004 Musical Help!! Atchii Chikyu o Samasunda.  Another album track, "Help!!", is also from Help!! Atchii Chikyu o Samasunda; a slower version of the latter was recorded by band members Rika Ishikawa and Sayumi Michishige under the name Ecomoni and released on the compilation Petit Best 5.

The album was released at a pivotal and transitional time for the group, as upon its release in December 2004, it was already known that first generation member and group leader Kaori Iida and fourth generation member, Rika Ishikawa, would be leaving the group within three months of each other — Iida to embark on a solo career and Ishikawa to concentrate on her new group V-u-den.

Ai no Dai 6 Kan is also Mari Yaguchi's last album with the group, although she continues to work as a general entertainer under the Hello! Project banner that houses Morning Musume and its many offshoots.

A new version of the album track "Chokkan: Toki to Shite Koi wa", entitled "Chokkan 2: Nogashita Sakana wa Ōkiizo!" and featuring some different lyrics as well as new vocals by the post-Mari Yaguchi lineup, is the title track of Morning Musume's 28th single release. A live recording of the original version of "Chokkan..." was released on December 21, 2005 on the Hello! Project compilation Petit Best 6. The first pressing of album came in special packaging with a B3-sized special poster and Hello! Project Photo Card No. 0084.

Track listing 
All songs written by Tsunku
  – 3:46
  – 3:05
  – 4:16
  – 6:00
  – 4:15
  – 3:46
  – 3:31
  – 3:56
  – 5:36
 "Help!!" – 2:28
 "Ship! To the Future" – 3:33
  – 5:08

Personnel 

Shunzuke Suzuki – Keyboards, guitar, drum programming
Sting Miyamoto – Bass
Hiroshi Iida – Percussion
Masatsugu Sinozaki Strings Quartet – Strings
Yuichi Takahashi – Keyboards, guitar, drum programming
Atsuko Inaba – Vocals (background)
Ogu – Vocals (background), drums, percussion
Koji Makaino – Keyboards, guitar, bass, drum programming
Hideyuki "Daichi" Suzuki – Keyboards, guitar, bass, drum programming
Yoshinari Takegami – Brass arrangement, tenor sax
Futoshi Kobayashi – Trumpet
Wakaba Kawai – Trombone
Shoichiro Hitara – Keyboards, guitar, bass, drum programming
Tomohisa Hawazoe – Bass
Konta – Soprano sax
Yukari Hashimoto – Keyboards, drum programming
Hitoshi Watanabe – Bass
Yasuharu Nakanishi – Electric piano
Koichi Yuasa – Keyboards, guitar, bass, drum programming
Tsunku – Composer, vocals (background)

Production
Masakazu Kimura – Mix engineer 
Naoki Yamada – Mix engineer 
Kazumi Matsui – Mix engineer 
Ryo Wakizaka – Mix engineer
Shinnosi Kobayashi – Recording engineer
Yuichi Ohtsubo – Recording engineer
Mitsuo Koike – Mastering engineer

References

External links 
 Ai no Dai 6 Kan entry on the Hello! Project official website 

Morning Musume albums
Zetima albums
2004 albums
Electropop albums
Dance-pop albums by Japanese artists